Edward Kent (January 8, 1802 – May 19, 1877) was an American attorney and politician who served as the 12th and 15th Governor of Maine. He was among the last prominent members of the Whig Party in Maine before it collapsed in favor of the Republicans. He is the only Maine governor to have been elected to two non-consecutive terms (1838–39 and 1841–42), though his second term was through direct appointment by the Whig-dominated Maine Legislature.

Early life and education
Born in 1802 in Concord, New Hampshire, Kent was raised in Bangor, Maine. He graduated from Harvard University in 1821, in the same class as Ralph Waldo Emerson. According to a biographical article reprinted in the New York Times, "he had no rank in college and in truth was president of the "Lazy Club".

Career 
He apprenticed as a lawyer in Topsham, Maine, but established his own practice in the growing lumber-port of Bangor in 1825. He was elected to the Maine Legislature in 1829 and held political offices on and off the rest of his life, becoming the second mayor of Bangor (1836–1837) and governor of Maine.

Kent went into practice with Jonas Cutting in 1831 and their partnership lasted 18 years. The two constructed the Jonas Cutting–Edward Kent House in Bangor's Broadway neighborhood, which is listed on the National Register of Historic Places as an example of the Greek Revival style.

Kent ended his public life as an associate justice of the Maine Supreme Judicial Court (1859–73). His law partner and neighbor Jonas Cutting served almost concurrently in the same position (1854–75). Kent's uncle Prentiss Mellen had been the first chief justice of the same court.

Kent played a part in both instigating and resolving the Aroostook War.

Personal life 
While living in Rio de Janeiro, his wife and two children died of yellow fever. His surviving child died soon after they returned to Bangor. Kent married a second time, to Abigail Ann Rockwood who was the niece of first wife Sarah Johnston, and had one more child, Edward Kent Jr., who became the chief justice of the Arizona Territory Supreme Court.

He died of congestive heart failure in 1877 in Bangor, Maine, and is buried at the Mount Auburn Cemetery in Cambridge, Massachusetts.

Legacy 
Fort Kent, situated where the Fish River meets the Saint John River in the Saint John River Valley, was named in his honor. Later, the town of Fort Kent, Maine was named for the military installation (of which only a single blockhouse survives) and for Governor Kent.

References

Further reading
 David M. Gold. An Exemplary Whig: Edward Kent and the Whig Disposition in American Politics and Law (Lexington Books; 2012) 255 pages; scholarly biography

1802 births
1877 deaths
Harvard University alumni
Governors of Maine
Mayors of Bangor, Maine
Maine Whigs
Burials at Mount Auburn Cemetery
Politicians from Concord, New Hampshire
Whig Party state governors of the United States
19th-century American politicians
Justices of the Maine Supreme Judicial Court
19th-century American judges